{{DISPLAYTITLE:C5H13N}}
The molecular formula C5H13N (molar mass: 87.166 g/mol, exact mass: 87.10480 u) may refer to:

 1-Aminopentane
 3-Aminopentane
 Neopentylamine
 N-Methylisobutylamine
 N,N-diethylmethylamine